Alain Giletti (born 11 September 1939 in Bourg-en-Bresse, Ain) is a French figure skater.  He is the 1960 World champion, the 1955-1957 & 1960-1961 European champion and is a ten-time (1951–1957, 1959–1961) French national champion. At the age of 12, he represented France at the 1952 Winter Olympics, where he placed 7th.  He placed 4th at the 1956 Winter Olympics, and 4th again at the 1960 Winter Olympics.

He also competed as a pair skater. With partner Michèle Allard, he is the 1956 French national champion.

At the time Giletti won his World title in 1960, he was on leave from compulsory military service in France and expected to be sent on a four-month tour of Algeria upon his return.  He was normally stationed in Paris where his schedule allowed him to train in the mornings with his coach Jacqueline Vaudecrane.  Prior to starting his military service, he also trained in the United States with Pierre Brunet.  Giletti expected to defend his World title in 1961, but those championships were cancelled after the crash of Sabena Flight 548 killed all members of the U.S. team.  Giletti turned professional to tour with Holiday On Ice, Scala Eisrevue and later became a skating coach in Chamonix, France. Surya Bonaly is one of his students.
He currently trains figure skating in the Angoulême area, France.

Competitive highlights

References

 
 French Championships Historical Results
 
 

1939 births
Living people
French male single skaters
French male pair skaters
Sportspeople from Bourg-en-Bresse
Olympic figure skaters of France
Figure skaters at the 1952 Winter Olympics
Figure skaters at the 1956 Winter Olympics
Figure skaters at the 1960 Winter Olympics
World Figure Skating Championships medalists
European Figure Skating Championships medalists